Mettawa is a village in Lake County, Illinois, United States. Per the 2020 census, the population was 533. The village maintains trails for pedestrian, bicycle and equestrian usage. Five forest preserves of the Lake County Forest Preserve District are located within village boundaries.

History
The name of the town derived from Potawatomi chief Mettaywah, who lived in the area before signing the 1833 Treaty of Chicago and being displaced to Kansas. The traveler Colbee reported visiting the chief's village near the Des Plaines River and eating pork, cakes fried in pork fat, and a corn and bean dish. Many Potawatomi returned to Illinois annually until the end of the nineteenth century to visit their burial grounds.

Mettawa was founded by area residents in 1960 who worked together with a common goal of protecting their rural area from encroaching commercial development. Mettawa's first mayor was James Getz; subsequent mayors included Edward FitzSimons, Julius Abler, Barry McLean and Jess Ray. The current treasurer is Amy Weiland. Famous residents and property owners within the area now known as Mettawa have included two-time presidential nominee Adlai E. Stevenson, city planner Edward H. Bennett, and more recently, news anchor and rancher Bill Kurtis and the Chicago Bears' linebacker Brian Urlacher and running back Matt Forte. Stevenson's Mettawa estate on the Des Plaines River is a designated Illinois Historic Site and is listed on the National Register of Historic Places.

Government
Mettawa is governed by an elected Mayor and a six-member Board of Trustees.

Mayor
Casey Urlacher
Board of Trustees
Carol Armstrong
Denis Bohm
Wendie Clark
Jan Pink
John Maier
Tim Towne

Mettawa lacks a dedicated Village Hall and has few paid administrative staff. Village meetings are held in a local hotel, and the Village contracts with an engineer, attorney, Mettawa Open Lands Association, and various consultants for operational services. In January 2009, the Village Board established its website which serves as a virtual Village Hall, providing official information including Village contacts, official documents and maps, meeting agendas and the Comprehensive Plan.

Conservation and recreation
 
Mettawa was founded by conservationist landowners and continues to be a center of land conservation and restoration activities. The village also supports a rural, equestrian-friendly lifestyle. Some residents maintain small farming operations, and there are eight horse stables within the village's borders.

The Mettawa Open Lands Association (MOLA) is a non-profit organization which promotes quality open space within the village and encourages the protection of public and private open lands. MOLA supports Mettawa-area residents and open lands (including unincorporated housing developments that are surrounded by village land) with public workdays and educational programs, and provides quality open space management on village properties. In celebration of Mettawa's 50th anniversary in 2010, MOLA distributed complimentary wildflower seed packets to all village residents and to many residents in neighboring areas, and suggested that recipients plant the seeds along roadsides to help beautify the area.

MOLA maintains the Whippoorwill Farm Preserve, an open lands area owned by the village (just west of I-94 at the northwest corner of IL-60/Townline Road and Riverwoods Boulevard). Whippoorwill Farm is currently undergoing restoration to a native prairie/wetland habitat.

The Lake County Forest Preserve District maintains five forest preserves within village boundaries, including Old School, Grainger Woods, McArthur Woods, Captain Daniel Wright Woods and Adlai Stevenson Historic Home.

Mettawa also includes nine areas designated as Illinois Nature Preserves, one area within the Libertyville Township Open Space District, and the Covington Charitable Trust area (maintained by the Lake Forest Open Lands Association).

The Des Plaines River Trail runs through the western edge of Mettawa and connects with the village's own Mettawa Trail system, which is used by pedestrians, cyclists and equestrians.

Commercial development
Commercial development has occurred within and adjacent to Mettawa in recent years, despite resistance by residents and the Village Board). However, an unusually high percentage of the commercial structures are green buildings which have achieved high Leadership in Energy and Environmental Design (LEED) ratings. Tax revenues from businesses in Mettawa provide income to the village, which in turn provides eligible residents with a tax rebate.

HSBC completed construction of its North American headquarters in Mettawa in 2008. Although no longer corporate headquarters, the building remains partially occupied by HSBC. This building achieved LEED Gold Certification and in March 2009 was named Green Development of the Year by the National Association of Industrial and Office Properties (NAIOP).

The W. W. Grainger company's headquarters is located on unincorporated land enclosed within Mettawa's borders. In 2008 this building was updated to achieve its 2009 Gold LEED certification. Grainger purchased  of land in Mettawa (1993–1998), then disconnected from the village to become part of unincorporated Lake County. In 1996 (jobs), all of this land was annexed back into the village, with the exception of the  office campus. Grainger donated  to the Lake County Forest Preserve District. The resulting Grainger Forest Preserve hosts an equestrian center and includes open lands filled with rare ecosystems and species. The remaining Grainger acreage is within the village and zoned  residential.

Major businesses located near the busy intersection of Interstate 94 and Illinois Route 60 in Mettawa include CDW, Residence Inn, Hilton Garden Inn, and Costco. Businesses located along Boulton Boulevard (east of I-94 in Mettawa's northeast corner) include Impact Networking, Metro Self-Storage and Stage Right, Inc.

Residential development
 
The village maintains a low-density five-acre zoning requirement for residential development. Most of Mettawa's Planned Unit Developments (PUD) have included conservation easements and land restoration.

The Deerpath Farm conservation community, Mettawa's largest PUD, includes  of restored open lands managed by the Lake Forest Open Lands Association, and also sponsors community workdays and nature education events. In 2006 it was named Development of the Year by the Lake County Stormwater Management Association for its innovative hydrology management based on wetland restoration.

Other PUDs within Mettawa include Sanctuary Estates and Mettawa Woods.

Notable people
Matt Forte, former American football player with the NFL's Chicago Bears and New York Jets
Bill Kurtis, News caster and American crime documentary narrator
Brian Urlacher, former American football player with the NFL's Chicago Bears
Casey Urlacher, Mayor of Mettawa, brother of Brian
Adlai Stevenson II, 31st Governor of Illinois

Geography
Mettawa is located at  (42.243972, -87.917909).

Demographics

2020 census

2000 Census
As of the census of 2000, there were 367 people, 135 households, and 108 families living in the village. The racial makeup of the village was 95.64% White, 2.45% Asian, 1.09% from other races, and 0.82% from two or more races. Hispanic or Latino of any race were 4.09% of the population.

There were 135 households, out of which 33.3% had children under the age of 18 living with them, 75.6% were married couples living together, 1.5% had a female householder with no husband present, and 19.3% were non-families. 16.3% of all households were made up of individuals, and 6.7% had someone living alone who was 65 years of age or older. The average household size was 2.68 and the average family size was 2.96.

In the village, the population was spread out, with 24.0% under the age of 18, 6.0% from 18 to 24, 20.4% from 25 to 44, 36.2% from 45 to 64, and 13.4% who were 65 years of age or older. The median age was 45 years. For every 100 females, there were 103.9 males. For every 100 females age 18 and over, there were 103.6 males.

The median income for a household in the village was $127,388, and the median income for a family was $153,129. Males had a median income of $100,000 versus $51,250 for females. The per capita income for the village was $89,104. About 3.1% of families and 4.6% of the population were below the poverty line, including 7.1% of those under age 18 and 7.1% of those age 65 or over.

Adjacent communities include Lake Forest, Lincolnshire, Vernon Hills, Libertyville, and Green Oaks.

As of the 2010 US Census, there were 547 people living in the village. The racial makeup of the village was 89.95% White, 1.83% African American, 4.57% Asian, 1.83% from other races, and 1.83% from two or more races. Hispanic or Latino of any race were 10.97% of the population.

Notes

References
 Haines, Elijah M., "Historical and Statistical Sketches of Lake County, State of Illinois," (1852) Waukegan, Illinois: E.G. Howe, Part II: Town of Vernon, page 95

External links
 Village of Mettawa official website
 Mettawa, IL, at the Encyclopedia of Chicago

Villages in Illinois
Villages in Lake County, Illinois
Populated places established in 1960